Caroline Siems (born 9 May 1999) is a German footballer who plays as a defender for Frauen-Bundesliga team Bayer Leverkusen.

Early and personal life
Siems was born in Berlin.

Club career
She played youth football with Viktoria Berlin and senior football with Turbine Potsdam II and Turbine Potsdam before signing for Aston Villa in 2020. In May 2021, it was announced that Siems would leave the club upon the expiry of her contract at the end of the following month.

International career
She has represented Germany at under-15, under-17, under-19 and under-20 levels.

References

External links
 
 
 

Living people
1999 births
German women's footballers
Germany women's youth international footballers
Footballers from Berlin
Women's association football defenders
1. FFC Turbine Potsdam players
Aston Villa W.F.C. players
2. Frauen-Bundesliga players
Frauen-Bundesliga players
Women's Super League players
German expatriate women's footballers
Expatriate footballers in England
German expatriate sportspeople in England
Bayer 04 Leverkusen (women) players